Svend Unmack Larsen (23 September 1893, in Aarhus – 23 March 1965) was a Danish politician for the Social Democratic Party who served as Denmark's Minister of Justice (1939–1940) and was the mayor of Aarhus, Denmark for 13 years (1945–1958).

Early life
Larsen was born in Aarhus on 23 September 1893, the son of L.M. Larsen and Thyra Vilhelmine Unmack. His father was the director of the city's poorhouse and Larsen was raised there. Larsen said that his childhood among the poor was "this mixture of tragedy and baroque, macabre comedy" and gave him an understanding of social problems and the dark sides of society. Larsen had an older brother, Eiler Larsen, who earned fame as "the Greeter" in Laguna Beach, California.

Career
Larsen graduated from law school in 1918 and worked in the criminal courts. He served as chairman of the district rent control board. As chairman of the city library association, Larsen was instrumental in forcing the city to refurbish its library system. Later, as a member of the city council, he chaired the committee for public library construction. Larsen was elected to the city council and served from 1 April 1933 until March 1937 when he chose not to run again. In September 1939, Larsen accepted a position as the Justice Minister of Denmark for Prime Minister of Denmark Thorvald Stauning. Following the Nazi occupation of Denmark on 9 April 1940, the Germans took issue with Larsen's hard stance against Danish Nazis. They removed Larsen from office on 8 July 1940. He was again elected to the Aarhus city council in 1943. Following the sudden death of Aarhus mayor, Stecher Christensen, Larsen was chosen as his successor beginning 21 June 1945. He served until 1 October 1958.

The Danish historian Ole Degn stated that Larsen was a primary influence on social and philanthropic development: new public housing projects, the preservation of natural green spaces and beaches, and the support of the arts, library science and cultural institutions. According to Degn, Larsen suffered from violent mood swings. Debilitating depression led him to abandon political office in 1958.

Personal life
Larsen married Ingeborg Carla Held Andersen, the daughter of a postmaster, on 27 November 1919. She died on 15 January 1961 in Aarhus. Larsen died 23 March 1965.

See also 
 List of mayors of Aarhus

Notes

Sources

External links
portrait of Svend Unmack Larsen by Aage Fredslund Andersen
http://www.gravsted.dk/person.php?navn=svendunmacklarsen Larsen's gravestone] at Nordre Cemetery

1893 births
1965 deaths
Politicians from Aarhus
Social Democrats (Denmark) politicians
Mayors of places in Denmark
Danish Justice Ministers
20th-century Danish politicians